No Ceilings 3 is a double disc mixtape by American rapper Lil Wayne, hosted by DJ Khaled. The A Side was released on November 27, 2020. It features guest appearances from Drake, Young Thug, Gudda Gudda, Euro, Cory Gunz, HoodyBaby, Vice Versa, YD, and Jay Jones. The B Side was released on December 18, with additional guest appearances from Big Sean, Rich The Kid, Lil Twist, and 2 Chainz.

Promotion
On August 28, 2020, Wayne re-released the 2009 mixtape No Ceilings for commercial release on streaming services. He also announced the second sequel to the mixtape during an interview on ESPN. On November 25, the mixtape was officially announced by DJ Khaled with the release date, previewing two songs. In an exclusive press release, Lil Wayne told Complex: "The mixtape game seemed to be a dying art and since I'm one of the pioneers of the craft, and it played such a big part in my career, I felt it was only right to resurrect it. Also, it's a lot of songs out here I wanted to kill my way." On December 1, "B.B. King Freestyle" was released commercially on streaming services.

Track listing

References

Lil Wayne albums
2020 mixtape albums
Sequel albums
Young Money Entertainment albums